Make Way is the first album by British singer-songwriter Charlie Winston.  It was released in 2007.

Track listing
 Like A Hobo (5:07)
 Generation Spent (3:37)
 Boxes (4:35)
 Nine Year Old Friend (3:33)
 My Life As A Duck (4:47)
 I Love Your Smile (4:58)
 Yes! (4:05)
 Life's A Bitch (4:55)
 Can We Do It? (4:16)
 Calling Me/Gone Gone (13:59)

External links 
 The official Charlie Winston website
 Charlie Winston's profile on MySpace

2007 debut albums
Charlie Winston albums